In Chinese philosophy, fire is the prosper of the matter, or the matter's prosperity stage. Fire is the second phase of Wu Xing.

Fire is yang in character. Its motion is upward and its energy is convective.  

Fire is associated with Summer, the South, the planet Mars, the color red (associated with extreme luck), hot weather, daylight, and the Vermilion Bird (Zhu Que) in the Four Symbols.

Attributes
In Traditional Chinese Medicine, Fire attributes are considered to be dynamism, strength, and persistence; however, it is also connected to restlessness. The fire element provides warmth, enthusiasm, and creativity; however, an excess of it can bring aggression, impatience, and impulsive behavior. In the same way, fire provides heat and warmth; however, an excess can also burn.

Fire is associated with negative emotions of hate and  the positive emotion is joy. 

The organs associated with the Fire element are the Heart (yin) and small intestine (yang), tongue and a body's pulse.

Astrology
The element plays an important role in Chinese astrology and feng shui. Fire is included in the 10 heavenly stems (the five elements in their yin and yang forms), which combine with the 12 Earthly Branches (or Chinese signs of the zodiac), to form the 60 year cycle.

Yang Fire years end in 6 (e.g. 1976).
(Yang years end in an even number.)

Yin Fire years end in 7 (e.g. 1977).
(Yin years end in an odd number.)

Fire governs the Chinese zodiac signs Snake and Horse.

Flying Star Feng Shui uses number 9 to represent Fire.

The South corner releases energy of Fire as I Ching and Feng Shui states. It is generally referred as energy of destroying and rebuilding. It also directly relates to a lucky lovelife.

Cycles of Wu Xing
In the regenerative cycle of Wu Xing, wood engenders Fire as "fire is generated by rubbing together two pieces of wood" and it must be fueled by burning wood; Fire begets earth as "fire reduces everything to ashes, which become a part of the earth again".

In the conquest cycle, water overcomes Fire as "nothing will put out a fire as quickly as water"; Fire overcomes metal as it "can only be melted and forged" by flame or heat.

References

it:Fuoco (elemento)#Tradizione cinese